The 2020 Kansas House of Representatives elections took place as a part of the 2020 United States elections. All 125 seats in the Kansas House of Representatives were up for re-election. Representatives serve two year terms and are not term limited.

Results Summary

Predictions

Close races
Districts where the margin of victory was under 10%:
 District 48, 0.46% 
 District 102, 0.46%
 District 16, 0.48% 
 District 49, 2.14% 
 District 56, 2.36% 
 District 15, 2.94% 
 District 20, 3.1% (flip) 
 District 30, 4.18% 
 District 18, 4.7% 
 District 78, 4.72%
 District 17, 5.06% (flip) 
 District 14, 5.8% 
 District 41, 6% (flip)
 District 28, 6.3% 
 District 96, 6.52% (flip) 
 District 33, 7.16% 
 District 67, 7.44% 
 District 3, 7.96% (flip)
 District 40, 8.08% 
 District 87, 8.76%
 District 53, 9.74% 
 District 72, 9.84% (flip) 
 District 39, 9.56%

Results

District 1

District 2

District 3

District 4

District 5

District 6

District 7

District 8

District 9

District 10

District 11

District 12

District 13

District 14

District 15

District 16

District 17

District 18

District 19

District 20

District 21

District 22

District 23

District 24

District 25

District 26

District 27

District 28

District 29

District 30

District 31

District 32

District 33

District 34

District 35

District 36

District 37

District 38

District 39

District 40

District 41

District 42

District 43

District 44

District 45

District 46

District 47

District 48

District 49

District 50

District 51

District 52

District 53

District 54

District 55

District 56

District 57

District 58

District 59

District 60

District 61

District 62

District 63

District 64

District 65

District 66

District 67

District 68

District 69

District 70

District 71

District 72

District 73

District 74

District 75

District 76

District 77

District 78

District 79

District 80

District 81

District 82

District 83

District 84

District 85

District 86

District 87

District 88

District 89

District 90

District 91

District 92

District 93

District 94

District 95

District 96

District 97

District 98

District 99

District 100

District 101

District 102

District 103

District 104

District 105

District 106

District 107

District 108

District 109

District 110

District 111

District 112

District 113

District 114

District 115

District 116

District 117 
He died in office on September 30, 2020, but still remained on the ballot.

District 118

District 119

District 120

District 121

District 122

District 123

District 124

District 125

Notes

References

Kansas
House of Representatives
Kansas House of Representatives elections